Jonathan Miles may refer to:

 Jonathan Miles (novelist) (born 1971), American novelist
 Jonathan Miles, English novelist
 Jonathan Miles (filmmaker), British filmmaker
 Jonathan Miles (footballer) (born 1993), English footballer
 Jonathan Miles (cricketer) (born 1986), English cricketer
 Jonathan Miles (17th century), the founder of Jonathan's Coffee-House
 Reginald F. Sparkes (1906–1990), educator, author and political figure in Newfoundland who wrote a weekly column under the name "Jonathan Miles"